Agarijeh (also Romanized as Agarījeh; also known as Agarjeh, Akarcheh, and Akrīcheh) is a village in Chenarud-e Jonubi Rural District, Chenarud District, Chadegan County, Isfahan Province, Iran. At the 2006 census, its population was 34, in 9 families.

References 

Populated places in Chadegan County